Konstantin Mikhailovich Sovetkin (born 19 February 1989) is a Russian former footballer.

Career
A product of FC Spartak Moscow's youth system, Sovetkin made his Russian Premier League debut with Spartak's senior side in 2008. Spartak manager Stanislav Cherchesov had promoted Sovetkin to the senior side after the club suffered a 1–5 defeat to PFC CSKA Moscow.

References

External links
  Player page on the official FC Spartak Moscow website
 

1989 births
Footballers from Moscow
Living people
Russian footballers
Association football midfielders
FC Spartak Moscow players
FC Anzhi Makhachkala players
FC Spartak Kostroma players
Russian Premier League players
FC Volga Ulyanovsk players